Gembloux is a city and municipality of Wallonia located in the province of Namur, Belgium.

On 1 January 2006 the municipality had 21,964 inhabitants. The total area is 95.86 km², yielding a population density of 229 inhabitants per km². The mayor, who was elected on 8 October 2006, is Benoît Dispa.

The municipality consists of the following districts: Beuzet, Bossière, Bothey, Corroy-le-Château, Ernage, Gembloux, Grand-Leez, Grand-Manil, Isnes, Lonzée, Mazy, and Sauvenière.

This city is well known for its Agricultural University and for its cutlery. The university is housed in the historical Abbey of Gembloux, which dates from the tenth century.

Gembloux's belfry is a UNESCO World Heritage Site, as part of the Belfries of Belgium and France site, in recognition of its architecture and testimony to the rise in municipal power in the area.

History

The central city grew around the Gembloux Abbey, founded in the tenth century. In the vicinity of the city, in 1578, the Battle of Gembloux was fought during the Eighty Years' War. In May 1940 the Battle of Hannut and the Battle of the Gembloux Gap took place nearby, tank battles during the larger Battle of France.

Notable inhabitants
 The Marquess of Trazegnies d'Ittre
Christophe Szpajdel, sketch artist (born 1970)

Twin towns
Gembloux is twinned with
  - Épinal, France : since 1974
  - Loughborough, United Kingdom : since 1993
  - Skyros, Greece : since 1994
  - Aller, Spain : since 2007

Gallery

See also
 List of protected heritage sites in Gembloux
 Crealys Science Park

References

External links

Gembloux official site (in French)

 
Cities in Wallonia
Municipalities of Namur (province)